John Bamford GC (born 7 March 1937 in Newthorpe, near Eastwood, Nottinghamshire), known as Jack Bamford, is the youngest person to have been directly awarded the George Cross.  On 19 October 1952, aged 15, he rescued his two younger brothers from their upstairs bedroom when a fire occurred during the night at their home in Newthorpe. He took four months to recover from the injuries he sustained. He was awarded the George Cross in December 1952.

However, because in 1971 the Albert Medal and Edward Medal became eligible for exchange for a GC, he lost his record as the youngest recipient to David Western, who had been awarded the Albert Medal in 1948 at the age of 11.

A fire broke out in a house occupied by a man, his wife and six children, and in a very short time was burning fiercely. John and his father went downstairs and upon opening the living room door at the foot of the stairs the interior of the room burst into flames. Owing to the intense heat they were unable to get back upstairs to the rest of the family. They ran out through the front door, climbed on to the top of a bay window which gave access to a bedroom, opened the window and helped three of the children and the mother on to the flat roof. John Bamford and his father then climbed into the bedroom where they could hear the two remaining children, aged 4 and 6, shouting in the back bedroom, situated immediately above the seat of the fire. The bedroom doors at the head of the stairs were enveloped by flames. The father draped a blanket around himself and attempted to reach the children but the blanket caught fire and he was driven back. John Bamford then told his father to go to the back of the house while he got down on his hands and knees and crawled through the flames into the bedroom.

His shirt was completely burned upon him but nevertheless he snatched the two young boys from the bed and managed to get them to the window. He dropped the younger boy from the window into his father's arms but the elder boy struggled from his grasp. Bamford could then have got out himself but he left the window and chased the screaming child through the flames across the room. He eventually managed to catch him and throw him from the window.

By this time John Bamford was fast losing consciousness. He was terribly burned on the face, neck, chest, back, arms and hands but he managed to get one leg over the window sill and then fell to the ground.

John Bamford displayed courage of the highest order, and in spite of excruciating pain succeeded in rescuing his two brothers."

References 

British recipients of the George Cross
1937 births
Living people
People from Eastwood, Nottinghamshire